Nahida Mahour Bacha Touhami (born 10 February 1978) is an Algerian middle distance runner who specializes in the women's 800 and 1500 metres.

Achievements

Personal bests
200 metres - 24.85 s (1996)
400 metres - 53.08 s (2003)
800 metres - 1:59.65 min (2004)
1500 metres - 4:05.25 min (2004)

External links

1978 births
Living people
Algerian female middle-distance runners
Athletes (track and field) at the 2004 Summer Olympics
Athletes (track and field) at the 2008 Summer Olympics
Olympic athletes of Algeria
African Games bronze medalists for Algeria
African Games medalists in athletics (track and field)
Athletes (track and field) at the 1999 All-Africa Games
Athletes (track and field) at the 2003 All-Africa Games
Athletes (track and field) at the 2007 All-Africa Games
Athletes (track and field) at the 2001 Mediterranean Games
Mediterranean Games competitors for Algeria
21st-century Algerian women
20th-century Algerian women